Nutakki Priyanka (born 1 June 2002) is an Indian chess player. She received the FIDE title of Woman International Master (WIM) in 2018.

Biography
Nutakki Priyanka is winner of Indian Youth Chess Championships in different girl's age groups: U9 (2011), U11 (2013), and U13 (2015). In 2012, she won the Asian Youth Chess Championship for girls in the U10 age group and World Youth Chess Championship for girls in the U10 age group.

In August 2018, she was the best among women in the "Riga Technical University Open" tournament "A".

References

External links
 
 
 
 

2002 births
Living people
People from Krishna district
Indian female chess players
Chess Woman International Masters